Chaetopodella is a subgenus of flies belonging to the family Lesser Dung flies.

Species
C. keniaca Papp, 2008
C. reducta Papp, 2008

References

 

Sphaeroceridae
Diptera of Africa
Insect subgenera